Flavokavain B is a flavokavain found in the kava plant. In 2010 a paper was published identifying it as a glutathione-depleting hepatotoxin.

FKB is said by enthusiasts to occur at higher concentrations in "tudei" kava strains, which are generally considered less desirable.

See also
Kavalactone

References

External links
Flavokawain B at the United States National Library of Medicine

Kava
Phenol ethers